"The Story of a Mother" is a story by the Danish poet, travel writer, short story writer and novelist Hans Christian Andersen (1805-1875). The tale was first published December 1847. The story has been made into films several times, and was also adapted into an animated film using the stop-motion puppet technique.

Synopsis
A mother has not slept for three days and nights watching over her sick child.  When she closes her eyes for just a moment, Death comes and takes her child. The mother rushes into the street and asks a woman, who is Night, which way Death went.

Night tells her to go into the forest, but first the mother must sing every lullaby that she has ever sung for her child. In the forest, a thorn bush tells her which way to continue, but only after she has warmed the bush by pressing it to her chest, causing her to bleed. The mother then reaches a lake that carries her across in exchange for her eyes, which she cries out.

The now blind mother reaches the greenhouse where Death cares for the flowers and trees, each one a human life. Here the mother finds the little sick plant that is her child, recognizing it by the sound of its heartbeat. The old woman who helps care for the greenhouse tells her, in exchange for her hair, that when Death comes, she must threaten to rip up the other flowers. Death will then be afraid for he must answer to God; only God decides when the plants are pulled up and planted in the garden of Paradise, where we do not know what happens.

Death gives her back her eyes and asks her to look into a well. Here she sees the futures of two children, one full of happiness and love, the other full of misery and despair. He says that one of these futures would be the future of her child, were it to live.

Then the mother screams in fear, "Which is my child! Rather carry my child into God's kingdom than allow it to suffer such a life."

Death says, "I do not understand. Do you want your child back or should I carry it away into the unknown?"

And the mother wrings her hands, gets down on her knees, and prays to God:

"Do not listen to me when I ask against your will! Do not listen to me, do not listen to me, do not listen to me!"

And Death leaves, carrying her child into the unknown land.

In popular culture

Films
  (1949), a Danish film directed by Max Louw.
  (1963), a Danish film directed by Erik Kirchner, Erik Mortensen and Jørgen Thoms.
" (Don't Give Up, Mother)" (1971), an episode of the Japanese anime series Andersen Monogatari, directed by Masami Hata.
  (1977), a Danish stop-motion animation film directed by Jørgen Vestergaard.
 The Story of a Mother (1979), a Danish film directed by Claus Weeke.
 Death and the Mother (1988), an English film directed by Ruth Lingford.
  (2003), a Mexican film directed by Erik Mariñelarena.
  (2005), a Danish TV movie directed by Svend Ploug Johansen.
 The Story of a Mother (2010). an Italian short film produced and directed by Alessandro De Vivo and Ivano di Natale.

Comics
 The Story of a Mother (2004), a Danish graphic novel by Peter Madsen.

Music
 "" (1992), a song by Norwegian band Bel Canto from their 1992 album Shimmering, Warm and Bright.
 American metal band Revocation made a song, "Cradle Robber", from their 2011 album Chaos of Forms, which is inspired by the story.
 "Mater Dolorosa" (1934), an opera in four tableaux by Daniel Sternefeld.

Art
Death and the Mother

Notes

External links

The Story of a Mother comic by Peter Madsen
English translation (full text) from "Andersen's Fairy Tales"
 

1847 short stories
Short stories by Hans Christian Andersen
Female characters in fairy tales
Fiction about personifications of death